George Arnold (1881, Hong Kong - 1962) was a British entomologist who 
specialised in aculeate Hymenoptera (particularly ants, sphecid wasps and pompilid wasps). 
From the Royal College of Science he was appointed to the Department of Cytology and Cancer Research at Liverpool and
then only worked on Hymenoptera as a hobby. In 1911 he became curator, and later director, of the National Museum of Southern Rhodesia, Bulawayo.

The butterfly species Anthene arnoldi, or Arnold's hairtail, was named after him by Neville Jones in 1918.

Works
Many scientific papers in Annals of the South African Museum and Occasional Papers: National Museum of Southern Rhodesia.

References
Pinhey, E.C.G. 1977. Rhodesia Science News 11(8): 205.
Varley, G.C. 1963. The President's remarks. Proceedings Royal Entomological Society of London (C) 27: 50.

External links
biodiversityexplorer.org

British entomologists
1962 deaths
1881 births
20th-century British zoologists
British people in British Hong Kong